The 1957 Copa Aldao was the final match to decide the winner of the Copa Aldao, the 18th. edition of the international competition organised by the Argentine and Uruguayan Associations together. The final (held ten years after than its previous edition) was contested by Uruguayan club Nacional and Argentine side River Plate.

In the first match, played at Estadio Centenario in Montevideo, River Plate won 2–1 but the second leg, to be held in Buenos Aires, was never played. As the associations did not decide about the issue, no title was awarded.

Qualified teams

Match details

First leg

Second leg 

As the second leg was never held, no champion was proclaimed.

References

1959 in Argentine football
1959 in Uruguayan football
Club Atlético River Plate matches
Club Nacional de Football matches
Football in Montevideo